Albright House may refer to:

Albright House (Fort Madison, Iowa), listed on the National Register of Historic Places in Lee County, Iowa
Albright-Dukes House, Laurens, South Carolina, listed on the National Register of Historic Places in Laurens County, South Carolina

See also
Daniel Albright Farm, Marquam, Oregon, listed on the National Register of Historic Places in Clackamas County, Oregon